Bahdanovich is a surname. Notable people with the surname include:

Aliaksandr Bahdanovich (born 1982), Belarusian sprint canoer
Andrei Bahdanovich (born 1987), Belarusian sprint canoer
Maksim Bahdanovich (1891–1917), Belarusian poet, journalist, and translator